My Husband's Other Wife is a 1920 American silent drama film directed by J. Stuart Blackton and starring Sylvia Breamer, Robert Gordon and May McAvoy. There are no known archival holdings of the film, so it is presumably a lost film.

Cast
 Sylvia Breamer as Adelaide Hedlar 
 Robert Gordon as Wilifred Dean 
 Warren Chandler as Dr. Mark Ridgewell
 May McAvoy as Nettie Bryson 
 Fanny Rice as Rita Rivulet

References

Bibliography
 Slide, Anthony. The Big V: A History of the Vitagraph Company. Scarecrow Press, 1987.

External links

1920 films
1920 drama films
Silent American drama films
Films directed by J. Stuart Blackton
American silent feature films
1920s English-language films
Pathé Exchange films
American black-and-white films
1920s American films